Labomimus is a genus of rove beetles.

Species
 Labomimus fimbriatus Yin & Hlaváč, in Yin, Hlaváč & Li, 2013
 Labomimus jizuensis Yin & Hlaváč, in Yin, Hlaváč & Li, 2013
 Labomimus sichuanicus Hlaváč, Nomura & Zhou, 2000
 Labomimus simplicipalpus Yin & Hlaváč, 2013, in Yin, Hlaváč & Li, 2013
 Labomimus tibialis (Yin & Li, 2012)
 Labomimus venustus (Yin & Li, 2012)
 Labomimus yunnanicus Hlaváč, Nomura & Zhou, 2000

References

External links
 Encyclopedia of Life entry

Pselaphitae
Pselaphinae genera